This is a list of the first minority male lawyer(s) and judge(s) in Indiana. It includes the year in which the men were admitted to practice law (in parentheses). Also included are other distinctions such as the first minority men in their state to graduate from law school or become a political figure.

Firsts in Indiana's history

Lawyers 

 First African American male: C. R. Richardson (1911)  
First Hispanic American male: Andres DeAguero (1974)

State judges 

 First African American male: Mercer M. Mance in 1958  
 First Latino American male: Lorenzo Arredondo (1972) around 1976 
 First Asian Pacific American male: G. Michael "Mike" Witte (1982) in 1984  
 First African American male (Indiana Court of Appeals): Robert D. Rucker (1976) in 1998 
 First Muslim American male: David Shaheed in 1999

Federal judges 
 First Hispanic American male (federal judge): Rodolfo Lozano in 1988  
 First Hispanic American male (Southern District Of Indiana): Mario Garcia in 2020

Attorney General of Indiana 

 First African American male: Curtis Hill in 2017

Assistant Attorney General 

 First African American male: Robert L. Bailey from 1929-1933

United States Attorney 

 First African American male (Southern District of Indiana): Zachary A. Myers in 2021
 First African American male (Northern District of Indiana): Clifford D. Johnson in 2021

Indiana State Bar Association 

 First African American male president: Rod Morgan in 2010

Firsts in local history 

 Jesús Ricardo Treviño: First Latino American male judge in Allen County, Indiana (2021)
 William Clarence Hueston, Sr.: First African American male to serve as a judge in Gary, Indiana (1924) [Lake County, Indiana]
 James C. Kimbrough: First African American male appointed as a Judge of the Lake County Superior Court, Indiana
 Salvador Vasquez: First Latino American male to serve as a Judge of the Lake County Criminal Court, Indiana (2003)
 Alfredo Estrada: First Latino American male to serve as President of the Lake County Bar Association (2022)
 Rudolph "Rudy" R. Pyle III: First African American male judge in Madison County, Indiana
 Gonzalo Manibog: First Filipino American male to graduate from the Indiana Law School in Indianapolis (1917) [Marion County, Indiana]
 James T.V. Hill: First African American male lawyer in Indianapolis, Marion County, Indiana
 Jose Salinas: First Latino American male elected as a judge in Marion County, Indiana
 Masuji Miyakawa: First Japanese American male to graduate from Indiana University Maurer School of Law (1905) [Monroe County, Indiana]
 Samuel Saul Dargan: First African American male to graduate from Indiana University Maurer School of Law (1909) [Monroe County, Indiana]
 Juan T. Santos: First Hispanic American male to graduate from Indiana University Maurer School of Law (1916) [Monroe County, Indiana]
 Joseph Chester Allen, Jr.: First African American male to serve as the President of the St. Joseph Bar Association [St. Joseph County, Indiana]
 Peter LaCava: First Italian American male lawyer in Mishawaka, St. Joseph County, Indiana

See also 

 List of first minority male lawyers and judges in the United States

Other topics of interest 

 List of first women lawyers and judges in the United States
 List of first women lawyers and judges in Indiana

References 

 
Minority, Illinois, first
Minority, Illinois, first
Legal history of Indiana
Lists of people from Indiana
Indiana lawyers